Scott Adams (born 1957) is the American creator of the Dilbert comic strip.

Scott Adams is also the name of:
 Scott Adams (game designer) (born 1952), American game designer
 Scott Adams (skier) (born 1971), Australian Paralympic skier
 Peggy Scott-Adams (born 1948), American R&B and soul singer
 Scott Adams (American football) (1966–2013), American football player

See also
Adam Scott (disambiguation)
Adams (surname)